Miandehi (also Romanized as Mīāndehī, Meyāndehī, and Mīyāndehī; also known as Mandehī and Miyāndeh) is a village in Mahvelat-e Jonubi Rural District, in the Central District of Mahvelat County, Razavi Khorasan Province, Iran. At the 2006 census, its population was 870, in 223 families.

References 

Populated places in Mahvelat County